"Breathe Your Name" is a song by the American pop rock band Sixpence None the Richer. It was released in 2002 on Reprise Records and Squint Entertainment as the debut radio single and as well as the opening track from their fourth studio album, Divine Discontent (2002). It is a pop song that was produced by Paul Fox and Matt Slocum and written by the latter.

Track listing

Charts

References

External links
 
 
 
 
 

2002 singles
2002 songs
Sixpence None the Richer songs
Reprise Records singles